Stéphane Nado (born 28 August 1972) is a French professional football coach and former player who is the manager of Championnat National 2 side Monaco B. As a player, he was a defender.

References 

1972 births
Living people
Sportspeople from Côtes-d'Armor
French footballers
Association football defenders
Stade Briochin players
Vannes OC players
GSI Pontivy players
French Division 4 (1978–1993) players
French Division 3 (1971–1993) players
Ligue 2 players
Championnat National 2 players
French football managers
Stade Brestois 29 non-playing staff
Olympique de Marseille non-playing staff
Stade Malherbe Caen non-playing staff
AS Monaco FC non-playing staff
AS Monaco FC managers

Championnat National 3 managers
Championnat National 2 managers
French expatriate football managers
Expatriate football managers in Monaco
French expatriate sportspeople in Monaco
Footballers from Brittany